The Miñor is a river of Galicia, Spain. It is 9.9 miles (16 km) long, and stretches from Or Galiñeiro to the places of Ramallosa and Sabarís.:gl:Sabar%C3%ADs, Santa Cristina da Ramallosa, Baiona

See also
 Rivers of Galicia

References

Rivers of Spain
Rivers of Galicia (Spain)